Rosalie Bertell (April 4, 1929 – June 14, 2012) was an American scientist, author, environmental activist, epidemiologist, and Catholic nun. Bertell was a sister of the Grey Nuns of the Sacred Heart, best known for her work in the field of ionizing radiation. A dual citizen of Canada and the United States, she worked in environmental health since 1970. In 1986, she was awarded the Right Livelihood Award for "raising public awareness about the destruction of the biosphere and human gene pool, especially by low-level radiation."

Biography
Rosalie Bertell was born to Paul G. and Helen (née Twohey) Bertell in Buffalo, New York, the third of four children. Her mother was Canadian, her father a citizen of the USA. She has an older sister, Mary Katherine Bertell (1925-2011), and a younger brother, John Twohey Bertell (1930-2002). A third sibling, Paul W. Bertell died in infancy in 1921. In 1966, she received a Ph.D in Biometrics from the Catholic University of America. She received her BA in Math/Physics/Education from D'Youville College, and later was an associate professor of mathematics at D'Youville from 1969-1973.

From 1969 to 1978, Bertell was senior cancer research scientist at Roswell Park Comprehensive Cancer Center. She was a consultant to the US Nuclear Regulatory Commission, the US Environmental Protection Agency, and to Health Canada.

In 1983, she received the "Hans-Adalbert Schweigart"-Medal from the World Union for Protection of Life. She was president of International Institute of Concern for Public Health from 1987 to 2004. She founded the International Medical Commission Chernobyl in 1996.

Bertell was a coordinator for the International Medical Commission on Bhopal, and campaigned for an independent body "to coordinate health care, research and rehabilitation" for victims of the Bhopal disaster.

Filmography 
Bertell appeared in at least five documentary films between 1985 and 2005. They include:

Death
Bertell died of cancer at age 83 at Saint Mary Medical Center, Langhorne, Pennsylvania.

Bibliography

She wrote the books No Immediate Danger: Prognosis for a Radioactive Earth (1985) and Planet Earth: The Latest Weapon of War (2000).

Awards
Bertell received many awards, including:

 Hans-Adalbert-Schweigart-Medal (1983)
 Right Livelihood Award (1986)
 World Federalist Peace Award
 Ontario Premier's Council on Health, Health Innovator Award (1991)
 United Nations Environment Programme Global 500 award
 Seán MacBride International Peace Prize

See also
 Irradiation
 Chemtrail conspiracy theory
 Alice Stewart
 Helen Caldicott

Archives 
There is a Rosalie Bertell fond at Library and Archives Canada. The archival reference number is R6847, former archival reference number MG31-K39. The fond covers the date range 1942 to 2001. It contains textual records, audio-visual material and graphic material.

References

External links
 International Institute of Concern for Public Health

Cancer researchers
Radiation health effects researchers
1929 births
2012 deaths
American women epidemiologists
American epidemiologists
American conspiracy theorists
Writers from Buffalo, New York
Deaths from cancer in Pennsylvania
American expatriates in Canada
Activists from Buffalo, New York
20th-century American Roman Catholic nuns
21st-century American Roman Catholic nuns